Daniele Mazzone (born 4 June 1992) is an Italian volleyball player for Diatec Trentino and the Italian national team.

He participated at the 2017 Men's European Volleyball Championship.
With the Italian Team he won the Mediterranean Games held in Mersin on 2013, the bronze medal in the FIVB World League 2013, the silver medal in the CEV European Championship 2013. 8 times in the Italian National Team.

References

1992 births
Living people
Italian men's volleyball players
Trentino Volley players
Mediterranean Games gold medalists for Italy
Mediterranean Games medalists in volleyball
Competitors at the 2013 Mediterranean Games